The Corvinus Journal of Sociology and Social Policy is a biannual peer-reviewed academic journal covering research in the social sciences. It was established in 2010 and is published by the Corvinus University of Budapest. The editor-in-chief is Márton Medgyesi(Corvinus University of Budapest).

Abstracting and indexing
The journal is abstracted and indexed by the Emerging Sources Citation Index, the International Bibliography of the Social Sciences, and Scopus.

See also
List of sociology journals
List of political science journals
List of international relations journals
List of economics journals

References

External links

Open access journals
Biannual journals
Political science journals
English-language journals
Sociology journals
Economics journals
Corvinus University of Budapest